Union Central Life Insurance Company was founded in Cincinnati, Ohio, in 1867. It was established as a mutual insurance company. Among its founders were Norman Wait Harris, founder of Harris Bank.

In 2005, it formed a mutual insurance holding company the Union Central Mutual Holding Company and converted the life insurance company to a stock company. On January 1, 2006, that holding company merged with the Ameritas Acacia Mutual Insurance Holding Company to form the UNIFI Mutual Holding Company. Union Central Life merged into Ameritas Life in 2013.

References

Mutual insurance companies of the United States
Defunct insurance companies
Defunct companies based in Cincinnati
American companies established in 1867
Financial services companies established in 1867
Financial services companies disestablished in 2013
1867 establishments in Ohio